The Irish Republican Army is any of several armed movements dedicated to Irish republicanism.

Irish Republican Army may also refer to:

Irish Republican Army (1919–1922), the original organisation, who fought in the Irish War of Independence and were recognised as the official army of the Irish Republic.
Irish Republican Army (1922–1969), the faction of the "Old IRA" who opposed the Anglo-Irish Treaty after the war.
Irish Republican Army, or Official Irish Republican Army, one faction of the IRA following a split in 1969, active until 1973.
Irish Republican Army, or Provisional Irish Republican Army, the other faction of the IRA following the 1969 split, active until 2005.
Irish Republican Army, or Continuity Irish Republican Army, which emerged from a split in the Provisional IRA over abstentionism, active since 1986.
Irish Republican Army, or Real Irish Republican Army, which emerged from a split in the Provisional IRA over the 1997 ceasefire, active since that time.